Block & Leviton is an American plaintiffs' law firm headquartered in Boston. The law firm was founded in 2011.

In April 2022, Block & Leviton filed a civil lawsuit against Elon Musk, alleging that Twitter shareholders may have suffered losses while Musk was building equity stake in the company.

References

External links
 

Privately held companies of the United States
Law firms based in Boston
Law firms established in 2011